Daniel Wafena Bell (July 23, 1891 – October 4, 1971) was an American civil servant and businessman. Born in Kinderhook, Illinois, he was acting director of the Bureau of the Budget (now the Office of Management and Budget) from September 1, 1934, until April 14, 1939.

He left the post to serve as Undersecretary of the Treasury from 1940 to 1945. Bell negotiated with Colonel Kenneth Nichols for the transfer of silver from the West Point Depository to the Manhattan Project, to substitute for scarce copper in the  electromagnets used in the electromagnetic separation process at the Y-12 National Security Complex; eventually about 14,700 tons of silver was used. Nichols initially said he needed six thousand tons of silver, but initially neither of them could convert the weight to troy ounces. When Nichols said What difference does it make how we express the quantity Bell replied Young man, you may think of silver in tons, but the Treasury will always think of silver in troy ounces.

After the Second World War, he became president of American Security and Trust Company. He died in 1971 at the age of 80, in his Washington home.

References

1891 births
1971 deaths
People from Pike County, Illinois
American bankers
Directors of the Office of Management and Budget
United States Department of the Treasury officials
National University School of Law alumni